Metcalfa pruinosa, the citrus flatid planthopper, is a species of insect in the Flatidae family of planthoppers first described by Thomas Say in 1830.

Subspecies
 Metcalfa pruinosa cubana (Metcalf & Bruner, 1948)

Distribution
The species is native to North America (Nearctic realm), but it is today found throughout Europe (Austria, Britain, France, Italy, Hungary, Romania, Slovenia, Poland, Switzerland, and Moldova), in the Neotropical realm and in South Korea.

Description

They are initially whitish. The color of adults may vary from brown to gray, in connection with the presence of a bluish white epicuticular wax, covering especially the nymphs. The large and prominent compound eyes are yellow. The mouthparts are adapted for piercing and sucking. The trapezoidal forewings are held vertically, wrapping the body when the insect is at rest. The front wings have veined costal cell and several characteristic whitish spots. The hind tibiae usually have two lateral spines in addition to the other spines at the apex.

Color varies from whitish to light green, with relative large tufts of white wax on the abdomen.

Behavior and ecological impact
The species is univoltine, producing one generation per year. Adults mate in fall during the night. The females lay about 100 eggs, usually in the bark of host plants. Eggs overwinter, hatching the following spring. The adults are seen mainly in summer and fall, when they feed gregariously on sap. When they feed on sap, they eject excess sugar in the form of honeydew. This attracts bees, which convert it to honey. 

As it feeds, it causes serious damages to field crops and ornamental plants. It is polyphagous, feeding on a variety of plant taxa. Host plants include maples, dogwoods, hawthorns, willows, elms, privet, black locust, and elder. It lives on crop plants such as grape, citrus, apricot, peach, blackberry, and raspberry.

Gallery

Bibliography
Glover T. (1877) Homoptera in Report of the Entomologist and Curator of the Museum, Report of the United States Commissioner of Agriculture. Washington, D. C., 1876: 17-46
Metcalf Z.P. (1957) Part 13. Flatidae and Hypochthonellidae, In: Metcalf Z. P. 1954 - General Catalogue of the Homoptera. Fascicule IV, North Carolina State College, Raleigh(United States of America). p. 1-565.
Pavel Lauterer (2002) Citrus Flatid Planthopper - Metcalfa pruinosa (Hemiptera: Flatidae), a New Pest of Ornamental Horticulture in the Czech Republic. In: Plant Protection Science. Vol. 38, No. 4, 2002, S. 145–148
Say T. (1830) Descriptions of new North American Hemipterous insects, belonging to the first family of the section Homoptera of Latreille, Journal of the Academy of Natural Sciences of Philadelphia, 6: 235-244.
Schaum H.R. (1850) Fulgorellae. Erster Section A-G. In: Ersch I. S. & Gruber I. G. 1850 Allgemeine Encyklopädie der Wissenschaften und Kunste in alnhaberischen folge von Genannten Schriftstellern bearbeitet und herausgegeben, 51. p. 58-73.

References

External links
 Biolib
 Animal Diversity
Santi, F. and S. Maini. Metcalfa pruinosa. Facoltà di Agraria Università di Bologna. (Italian)

Flatidae
Insects described in 1830
Taxa named by Thomas Say
Agricultural pest insects
Hemiptera of North America